Ingrid Burman (born 4 November 1952) is a Swedish Left Party politician. She was a member of the Riksdag from 1994 until 2006.

External links
Ingrid Burman at the Riksdag website

1952 births
21st-century Swedish women politicians
Living people
Members of the Riksdag 1994–1998
Members of the Riksdag 1998–2002
Members of the Riksdag 2002–2006
Members of the Riksdag from the Left Party (Sweden)
Place of birth missing (living people)
Women members of the Riksdag